The Bell UH-1Y Venom (also called Super Huey) is a twin-engine, medium-sized utility helicopter built by Bell Helicopter under the H-1 upgrade program of the United States Marine Corps. One of the latest members of the numerous Huey family, the UH-1Y is also called "Yankee", based on the NATO phonetic alphabet pronunciation of its variant letter. The UH-1Y was to have been remanufactured from UH-1Ns, but in 2005, it was approved for the aircraft to be built as new. After entering service in 2008, the UH-1Y replaced the USMC's aging fleet of UH-1N Twin Huey light utility helicopters, first introduced in the early 1970s. In 2008 it entered full-rate production, with deliveries to the Marines completed in 2018.

Development
Over the years, new avionics and radios, modern door guns, and safety upgrades have greatly increased the UH-1N's empty weight.

In 1996, the United States Marine Corps launched the H-1 upgrade program. A contract was signed with Bell Helicopter for upgrading 100 UH-1Ns into UH-1Ys and upgrading 180 AH-1Ws into AH-1Zs. The H-1 program modernized utility and attack helicopters with considerable design commonality to reduce operating costs. The UH-1Y and AH-1Z share a common tail boom, engines, rotor system, drivetrain, avionics architecture, software, controls, and displays for over 84% identical components.

Originally, the UH-1Y was to have been remanufactured from UH-1N airframes, but in April 2005, approval was granted to build them as new helicopters. Bell delivered two UH-1Ys to the U.S. Marine Corps in February 2008, and full-rate production was begun in September 2009. The Marine Corps purchased 160 Y-models to replace their inventory of N-models.

Design

The UH-1Y variant modernizes the UH-1 design. The Y-model upgrades pilot avionics to a glass cockpit, adds further safety modifications, and provides the UH-1 with a modern forward-looking infrared system.  Engine power was increased. Its most noticeable upgrade over previous variants is a four-blade, all-composite rotor system designed to withstand up to 23 mm rounds. By replacing the engines and the two-bladed rotor system with four composite blades, the Y-model returns the Huey to the utility role for which it was designed.

A  fuselage extension just forward of the main door was added for more capacity. The UH-1Y features upgraded transmissions and a digital cockpit with flat-panel multifunctional displays. Compared to the UH-1N, the Y-model has an increased payload, almost 50% greater range, a reduction in vibration, and higher cruising speed.

Operational history
The UH-1Y and AH-1Z completed their developmental testing in early 2006. During the first quarter of 2006 the UH-1Ys were transferred to the Operational Test Unit at NAS Patuxent River, where they began operational evaluation testing. In February 2008, the UH-1Y and AH-1Z began the second and final portion of testing. On 8 August 2008, the Marine Corps certified the UH-1Y as operationally capable, and it was deployed for the first time in January 2009 as part of the aviation combat element of the 13th Marine Expeditionary Unit. The UH-1N Twin Huey was retired by the Marines in August 2014, making the UH-1Y the Marine Corps' standard utility helicopter.

On 11 October 2017, the Defense Security Cooperation Agency notified the United States Congress of the potential sale of 12 UH-1Ys and related systems and support to the Czech Republic for a cost of US$575 million. In December 2019, an order for eight UH-1Y helicopters was approved.

Operators

 Czech Air Force (8 on order) Additional 2 to be transferred at no cost via the Excess Defense Articles programme.

United States Marine Corps
HMLA-167
HMLA-169
HMLA-267
HMLA-269
HMLA-367
HMLA-369
HMLA-469
HMLA-773
HMLAT-303

Specifications

See also

References

External links

 UH-1Y Venom page on BellHelicopter.com
 UH-1Y Venom page on US Navy RDA site
 UH-1Y Venom page on GlobalSecurity.org
 "US Navy proposes more UH-1Ys, AH-1Zs despite test phase setback", Flight International, 22 August 2008.

H-001Y, U
2000s United States military utility aircraft
United States military helicopters
2000s United States helicopters
Twin-turbine helicopters
Aircraft first flown in 2001